Jeffrey Francis Bullock (born August 12, 1959) is an American academic administrator and the current president of the University of Dubuque, a Presbyterian college in Dubuque, Iowa. He has been president of the university since 1998, after spending two years as dean of the University of Dubuque's Theological Seminary.

Bullock is a 1977 graduate of Jackson High School in Jackson, Minnesota. He has an MA (1993) and Ph.D. (1996) in Speech Communication from the University of Washington, an M.Div. from Pittsburgh Theological Seminary, and a BA from Seattle Pacific University. Bullock is also an adjunct professor at Seattle Pacific University.

He was ordained at the First Presbyterian Church in Jackson, Minnesota.

Bullock started his blog in 2013 and continues to publish on the topics of leadership, education, politics, and current events.

Early life and career 
Jeffrey Bullock was born in Ames, Iowa and raised in Omaha/Council Bluffs and Jackson, Minnesota.  He is the son of Patricia Spangler Bullock and Robert W. Bullock, and is a 4th generation Iowan.  He graduated from Jackson High School in 1977, and Seattle Pacific University in 1982 with a BA in Sociology.  He received his M.Div. degree from Pittsburgh Theological Seminary in 1985, and his MA and PhD in Speech Communication from the University of Washington in 1994 and 1996 respectively.

References

External links
 The University of Dubuque
 Seattle Pacific University
 University of Dubuque LIFE Program - Learning Institute for Fulfillment and Engagement

1959 births
Living people
People from Jackson, Minnesota
Heads of universities and colleges in the United States
People from Dubuque, Iowa
Pittsburgh Theological Seminary alumni
Seattle Pacific University alumni
Seattle Pacific University faculty
Seattle Pacific University people
American Presbyterians
University of Washington College of Arts and Sciences alumni